Patton & Miller was an architectural firm of Chicago, Illinois.

Normand Smith Patton and Grant C. Miller designed over 100 Carnegie libraries nationwide, including Buffalo Township Public Library, built in 1894, and 14 more in Illinois.

They designed numerous buildings which have been preserved and are listed on the National Register of Historic Places.

Works (with attribution variations) include:
Belmonte Flats, Chicago, NRHP-listed
Bethany Evangelical Lutheran Church Bible Chapel, Chicago (Patton & Miller)
Illinois Institute of Technology Academic Campus, built in the Romanesque revival architecture style that were designed by Patton & Fisher and their successor firm, Patton, Fisher & Miller
Spies Public Library
Peter White Public Library
Buffalo Township Public Library, 302 W. Mason St. Polo, IL (Patton and Miller), NRHP-listed
Carnegie Public Library, 125 S. College St. Tyler, TX (Patton & Miller), NRHP-listed
Carnegie Library, 634 College St., Beloit, Wisconsin (Patton and Miller, 1904), part of Near East Side Historic District
Chariton Free Public Library, 803 Braden Chariton, IA (Patton & Miller), NRHP-listed
Clinton Public Library, 306 8th Ave, S. Clinton, IA (Patton & Miller), NRHP-listed
Council Bluffs Free Public Library, 200 Pearl St. Council Bluffs, IA (Patton and Miller), NRHP-listed
Crawfordsville High School, 201 E. Jefferson St. Crawfordsville, IN (Patton & Miller), NRHP-listed
Danville Public Library, 307 N. Vermillion St. Danville, IL (Patton & Miller), NRHP-listed
Eau Claire Public Library, 217 S. Farwell St. Eau Claire, WI (Patton & Miller), NRHP-listed
Eckhart Public Library and Park, 603 S. Jackson St. Auburn, IN (Patton & Miller), NRHP-listed
Eldora Public Library, 1219 14th Ave. Eldora, IA (Patton & Miller), NRHP-listed
Elkhart County Courthouse, Courthouse Sq. Goshen, IN (Patton & Miller), NRHP-listed
Goshen Carnegie Public Library, 202 N. 5th St. Goshen, IN (Patton, Fisher, & Miller of Chica), NRHP-listed
Thomas A. Hendricks Library, College Dr. (Campus Rd.) Hanover, IN (Patton & Miller), NRHP-listed
Calvin C. Hill House (1904), 312 N. Euclid Avenue, Oak Park, Illinois (Patton & Miller)
Jacksonville Public Library (Illinois), 201 W. College Ave. Jacksonville, IL (Patton & Miller), NRHP-listed
Keep Cottage, 154 North Main St. Oberlin, OH (Patton & Miller), NRHP-listed
Kendall Young Public Library, 1201 Willson Ave. Webster City, IA (Patton & Miller), NRHP-listed
Kewanee Public Library, 102 S Tremont Kewanee, IL (Patton and Miller), NRHP-listed
Laird Hall, 70 Greenfield St. Tiffin, OH (Patton & Miller), NRHP-listed
Linton Public Library, 110 E. Vincennes St. Linton, IN (Patton & Miller), NRHP-listed
Lorain Historical Society, Carnegie Center at 329 W 10th St. Lorain, OH (Patton & Miller)
Mason City Public Library, 208 E. State St. Mason City, IA (Patton & Miller), NRHP-listed
Mount Pleasant Public Library, 200 N. Main St. Mount Pleasant, IA (Patton & Miller), NRHP-listed
Onawa Public Library, Iowa Ave. and 7th St. Onawa, IA (Patton & Miller), NRHP-listed
Oak Park and River Forest High School (1906), 201 N. Scoville Avenue, Oak Park, Illinois (1906 work attributed to Normand S. Patton and Robert C. Spencer; 1908 and 1911 work attributed to Patton & Miller)
Princeton Public Library, Illinois, (formerly Matson Public Library), 698 E. Peru St. Princeton, IL (Patton & Miller)
Pfleiderer Center for Religion and the Humanities, 28 Greenfield St. Tiffin, OH (Patton & Miller), NRHP-listed
Red Oak Public Library, 2nd and Washington Sts. Red Oak, IA (Patton & Miller), NRHP-listed
Streator Public Library, 130 S. Park St. Streator, IL (Patton & Miller), NRHP-listed
Vinton Public Library, 510 2nd Ave. Vinton, IA (Patton & Miller of Chicago), NRHP-listed
Williard Hall, 116 Greenfield St. Tiffin, OH (Patton & Miller), NRHP-listed
One or more works in Linton Commercial Historic District, roughly bounded by B St. N, 1st St. E, A St. S, 1st St. W Linton, IN (Patton & Miller), NRHP-listed

See also
Patton & Fisher

Notes
Clinton, Iowa architectural firm of Patton & Miller. Beaux Arts Classicism style with a monumental entry with processional steps and flanking paired columns. ...
Freeport, Illinois Carnegie Library in Illinois and one of the first Carnegie Libraries designed by the famous Chicago architectural firm of Patton and Miller. ...
Illinois Carnegie Libraries Multiple Property Submission

References

Architecture firms of the United States
Architecture firms based in Chicago